Sonina  is a village in the administrative district of Gmina Łańcut, within Łańcut County, Subcarpathian Voivodeship, in south-eastern Poland.

The village has a population of 2,836.

See also
 Walddeutsche

References

Sonina